Ludwik Mateusz Dembowski, also known as Louis-Mathieu Dembowski (1768, Dębowa Góra, Poland - 1812, Valladolid, Spain), was a Polish general and traveler.

After the fall of the Kościuszko Uprising went to France. He served in Polish Legions under Jan Henryk Dąbrowski, and with the French Army sent to Santo Domingo.

References

1768 births
1812 deaths
People from Kutno County
Clan of Jelita
French people of Polish descent
Polish generals
Polish commanders of the Napoleonic Wars